Augmate was founded as a wearable technology company by Pete Wassell in July 2013. It evolved into a device management platform and launched Augmate Connect for all devices in the Internet of Things (IoT) in 2017. The company originally developed applications for the workplace, connecting enterprise databases to wearable devices that include Glass, Vuzix M100, Epson Moverio, Kopin Golden-i or Optinvent ORA-S.

Augmate's Insights Platform visualizes the data sent to and collected via devices to extract actionable information for workers and managers.

Augmate provides developer tools through a device-agnostic software development kit and a data visualization platform.

The company is based in New York City.

History 
Augmate raised a $2.8 million seed round of financing in September 2014 from investors that include UPS Strategic Enterprise Fund, Siemens Venture Capital, Simon Venture Group, Rothenberg Ventures, Excell Partner, Camp One Ventures, FP Angels, and more

In October 2014, Augmate became a Certified Glass at Work Partner, a developer network authorized to deliver enterprise solutions for Glass.

References 

Wearable devices
Technology companies of the United States
Companies based in New York City